Sékou Touré (1 May 1934 – 2 April 2003) was an Ivorian professional footballer who played as a striker.

He played in Ivory Coast for ASEC and Africa Sports, before playing in France between 1958 and 1966 for Olympique Alès, Nîmes Olympique, Nice, Sochaux, US Forbach, Grenoble, Dieppe, Montpellier and AS Béziers.

Touré was the Ligue 1 top scorer in the 1961–62 season, scoring 25 goals.

Death 
On 2 April 2003, Touré died from an illness aged 69.

Honours 
Individual
 Ligue 1 top goalscorer: 1961–62

References

Sources
 
 
 

1934 births
2003 deaths
People from Bouaké
Ivorian footballers
Association football forwards
ASEC Mimosas players
Africa Sports d'Abidjan players
Olympique Alès players
FC Sochaux-Montbéliard players
US Forbach players
Montpellier HSC players
Grenoble Foot 38 players
OGC Nice players
Nîmes Olympique players
FC Dieppe players
AS Béziers Hérault (football) players
Ligue 1 players
Ligue 2 players
Ivorian expatriate footballers
Ivorian expatriate sportspeople in France
Expatriate footballers in France